John Christian Rapp (22 May 1928 in Helsinki, Finland – 4 July 2004) was a professional ice hockey player who played in the SM-sarja.  He played for HIFK.  He was inducted into the Finnish Hockey Hall of Fame in 1985.

External links
 Finnish Hockey Hall of Fame bio

1928 births
2004 deaths
HIFK (ice hockey) players
Ice hockey players at the 1952 Winter Olympics
Olympic ice hockey players of Finland
Ice hockey people from Helsinki